Leo Roman Kubiak (born December 25, 1926) is an American former professional basketball player. Kubiak was selected in the 1948 BAA Draft by the Rochester Royals. He played for the Waterloo Hawks of the National Basketball League in 1948–49, then when the team moved to the National Basketball Association in 1949–50, he played with them for one more season. Kubiak then ended his career playing for the Denver Refiners of the National Professional Basketball League in 1950–51.

Kubiak was also a minor league baseball player. He suited up for the Green Bay Bluejays of the Wisconsin State League in 1948. In 58 games he batted .264 while hitting five home runs.

As of December 2006, Kubiak resided in Lecanto, Florida. In 2018, he was interviewed about his time playing with the Waterloo Hawks.

References

External links
 Kubiak's Bowling Green Hall of Fame profile

1926 births
Living people
American men's basketball players
Basketball players from Ohio
Bowling Green Falcons baseball players
Bowling Green Falcons men's basketball players
Green Bay Bluejays players
Guards (basketball)
Rochester Royals draft picks
Sportspeople from Toledo, Ohio
Waterloo Hawks players